Intimate Connection is the sixth album by New York City-based band Kleeer released in 1984 and produced by Eumir Deodato.

Track listing
"Ride It" (Woody Cunningham)  5:40 	
"You Did It Again" (Norman Durham, Paul Crutchfield)  4:30
"Go For It" (Woody Cunningham)  5:03 		
"Intimate Connection" (Woody Cunningham, Norman Durham)  4:45	 	
"Next Time It's For Real" (Woody Cunningham, Norman Durham, Richard Lee)  5:20 	
"Break" (Paul Crutchfield, Woody Cunningham, Norman Durham)  5:00	 	
"Tonight" (Norman Durham)  5:07	 	
"Do You Want To?" (Eumir Deodato, Paul Crutchfield, Woody Cunningham, Norman Durham)  4:18

Personnel
Norman Durham - bass, synthesizer, electric piano, vocoder, lead and backing vocals
Woody Cunningham - lead and backing vocals
Paul Crutchfield - lead and backing vocals
Richard Lee - lead guitar, rhythm guitar, backing vocals
Kris Kellow - electric piano, acoustic piano, synthesizer
Eumir Deodato - electric piano, synthesizer, vocoder
Clifford Adams - trombone
Michael Ray - trumpet
Steven Greenfield - tenor and alto saxophone
Debbie Cole, Diane Garisto - backing vocals

Charts

References

External links
 Kleeer-Intimate Connection at Discogs

1984 albums
Kleeer albums
Atlantic Records albums
Albums produced by Eumir Deodato